Silvanus Bevan (1661–1725) was a burgess in the Welsh city of Swansea.

Early life
Silvanus Bevan was born in 1661 in Swansea, Wales.

Career
Bevan was a Quaker. Bevan owned property at Penclawdd Llanrhidian, and various farms and lands were bought including Gwen-y-Goredd, Tyry Gorge.

Personal life
In 1685, he married Jane Phillips. They had five sons and six daughters. Their eldest son, Silvanus Bevan FRS, was an apothecary.

Death
Bevan died in 1725 in Swansea, Wales.

References

1661 births
1725 deaths
People from Swansea
Welsh Quakers
Silvanus